Honia Ibrahim (born 20 December 2001) is an Iraqi swimmer. She competed in the women's 200 metre breaststroke event at the 2017 World Aquatics Championships.

References

2001 births
Living people
Iraqi female swimmers
Place of birth missing (living people)
Female breaststroke swimmers